Camila Fernanda Musante Müller (born 6 February 1990) is a Chilean lawyer, feminist activist and politician. Elected to the Chamber of Deputies for district 14 in 2021, she is one of the first openly bisexual Chilean congresswomen along with Francisca Bello.

Early life and education
Musante studied law at the Major University, graduating as a lawyer in 2015, and has a master's degree in environmental law. She is a member of the Association of Feminist Lawyers (Abofem) where she served as deputy director of Public Law  and director of the Agua para el Pueblo Foundation.

In 2018, Musante was a member of the Chile Environmental Law Observatory, belonging to the Autonomous University of Chile, and in 2019 she was part of the Chilean Human Rights Commission. She has also served as a member of the Center for Constitutional and Administrative Studies of the Major University, of which she was its founder, and as a columnist in the digital medium El Desconcierto.

Political career
From 2020 to 2021, Musante was a member of the Common Force, a political movement headed by Fernando Atria and part of the Broad Front. In the conventional constituent elections, she applied as an independent candidate in a Democratic Revolution quota in the Apruebo Dignidad pact for district No. 14, but was not elected. Later, in the parliamentary elections held in November of the same year, she was elected as deputy for the 14th district for AD as an independent in a Commons quota; she became one of the congresswomen representing sexual diversity along with Francisca Bello, Marcela Riquelme and Emilia Schneider.

References 

1990 births
Living people
People from Valdivia
Members of the Chamber of Deputies of Chile
Chilean LGBT politicians
Chilean women lawyers
Chilean feminists
Chilean bisexual people
Bisexual politicians
Bisexual women
LGBT legislators
Major University alumni
21st-century Chilean women politicians